La maison où j'ai grandi is a studio album of French pop singer Françoise Hardy. It was released in France in November 1966, on LP, Disques Vogue/Vogue international industries (CLD 702-30). Published without title, except for the word Françoise on the cover, but has become known by the title of the most successful song on the album, "La maison où j'ai grandi" ("The House where I Grew Up").

Track listing
Words and music were written by Françoise Hardy, except where noted. She is accompanied by the Johnny Harris orchestra.
 "Je changerais d’avis" – 2:53Original title: "Se telefonando"Lyrics: Ghigo De Chiara, Maurizio CostanzoMusic written by: Ennio MorriconeFirst sung by: Mina, 1966French adaptation by: Jacques Lanzmann and Françoise Hardy
 "Si c’est ça" – 2:09
 "Rendez-vous d’automne" – 2:40Lyrics: Jean-Max RivièreMusic written by: Gérard BourgeoisAccompanists: Charles Blackwell orchestra.
 "Je serai là pour toi" – 2:24
 "Peut-être que je t’aime" – 2:12
 "Il est des choses" – 2:31Original title: "Ci sono cose più grandi"Lyrics: Eliana de SabataMusic written by: Edoardo VianelloFirst sung by: Tony Renis, 1966French adaptation by: Françoise HardyAccompanists: Charles Blackwell orchestra.
 "Comme" – 1:54
 "Mes jours s’en vont" – 2:26
 "Qu’ils sont heureux" – 2:21Lyrics: Eddy MarnayMusic written by: André Popp
 "Surtout ne vous retournez pas" – 2:20
 "Tu es un peu à moi" – 2:14
 "La maison où j'ai grandi" – 3:39Original title: "Il ragazzo della via Gluck"Lyrics: Luciano Beretta and Michele "Miki" Del PreteMusic written by: Adriano CelentanoFirst sung by: Adriano Celentano, 1966French adaptation: Eddy MarnayAccompanists: Charles Blackwell orchestra.

LP records: first editions in English-speaking world 
, 1966: LP, Vogue (VGL 7022).
, 1966: LP, Vogue/Vogue international industries (VRL 3028).
, 1968: Vogue (SVL 933.540).
, 1968: La maison où j'ai grandi, Vogue/Vogue international industries (VC 6024).
, 1968: Vogue (SVL 933-540).

Reissues on CD 
 , 1996: Disques Vogue/Sony BMG (7 43213 80052 3).
 , October 16, 2015: CD, La maison où j'ai grandi, Light in the Attic Records/Future Days Recordings (FDR 618).

Reissue on 180g Vinyl 
, January 2016: La maison où j'ai grandi, Light in the Attic Records/Future Days Recordings (FDR 618).

Notes and references 

Françoise Hardy albums
1966 albums
French-language albums
Disques Vogue albums